Karl Auer (12 August 1903 – 22 February 1945) was a German international footballer.

Personal life
A businessman after retiring from playing, Auer served as a police sergeant-major in the German Army during the Second World War and was killed in action on the Eastern Front on 22 February 1945.

References

1903 births
1945 deaths
Association football midfielders
German footballers
Germany international footballers
German Army soldiers of World War II
German Army personnel killed in World War II